Coleophora lutipennella is a moth of the family Coleophoridae. It is found in most of Europe, except the Mediterranean islands.

Head pale yellow-ochreous. Antennae white, ringed with fuscous or dark fuscous. basal joint whitish-ochreous. Forewings light yellow-ochreous. Hindwings grey. Only reliably identified by dissection and microscopic examination of the genitalia.

The moth flies from July to August depending on the location.

The larvae feed on Castanea sativa, Quercus macranthera, Quercus petraea, Quercus pontica, Quercus pubescens and Quercus robur. The mouth angle is about 45°. Full-grown larvae can be found in early June.

References

External links
 
 Coleophora lutipennella at UKmoths

lutipennella
Moths described in 1838
Moths of Europe
Taxa named by Philipp Christoph Zeller